Ludwig Warnemünde (10 October 1916 – 24 September 2002) was a German long-distance runner. He competed in the marathon at the 1952 Summer Olympics.

References

1916 births
2002 deaths
Athletes (track and field) at the 1952 Summer Olympics
German male long-distance runners
German male marathon runners
Olympic athletes of Germany
Sportspeople from Kiel
20th-century German people